Afrocanthium kilifiense is a species of flowering plant in the family Rubiaceae. It is endemic to Kenya.

References

External links
World Checklist of Rubiaceae
 World Conservation Monitoring Centre 1998.  Canthium kilifiensis.   2006 IUCN Red List of Threatened Species.   Downloaded on 21 August 2007.

Vanguerieae
Endemic flora of Kenya
Vulnerable flora of Africa
Taxonomy articles created by Polbot
Taxa named by Diane Mary Bridson